Semaco "Zak" Moradi (born 16 January 1991) is a Kurdish, Irish hurler who plays as a left corner-forward for the Leitrim senior team.

Born in Ramadi, Iraq, Moradi and his family relocated to Carrick-on-Shannon, Ireland in 2002. He first played competitive hurling at juvenile and underage levels with the St. Mary's Kiltoghert club. After moving to Dublin, Moradi joined the Thomas Davis club.

Moradi made his debut on the inter-county scene when he joined the Leitrim senior team in 2010. Since then he has become a regular member of the starting fifteen. In 2016 Moradi was included on the Lory Meagher Cup Champions 15.

In June 2019, Moradi was part of the Leitrim team that won the 2019 Lory Meagher Cup after a 2–23 to 2–22 win against Lancashire at Croke Park.

His memoir Life Begins in Leitrim, written with Niall Kelly, was published in 2022.

Honours

 Dublin Intermediate Hurling Championship: Winner 2017
 Dublin Under 21 B Football Championship: Winner 2011
 Thomas Davis Hurler of the year 2016. 
 Oldbawn Sports person of the year: Winner 2010

Leitrim
Lory Meagher Cup (1) 2019

References

1990 births
Living people
Thomas Davis hurlers
Leitrim inter-county hurlers
People from County Leitrim
Iraqi emigrants to Ireland
Irish sportspeople by ethnic or national origin